The Manchester and Salford Savings Bank opened in 1818 in Manchester. For a long period, it was the third largest savings bank in the country and at one stage, the largest savings bank in England. Following the Trustee Savings Bank Act of 1975, the Bank merged with seven other local savings banks to form the TSB North West Central.

History

The Manchester and Salford Savings Bank was founded in December 1817 as a result of meetings of “the borough-reeves and constables”; it opened in Marsden Square only a month later, in January 1818. In contrast with many other small savings banks, which may have been supported by a local parish and by tradesmen, the Manchester and Salford Savings Bank had support of the highest order. The Bishop of Chester was President and members of Parliament, magistrates and “prominent gentlemen” were vice presidents. There were 17 trustees and 59 managers on the Board so that the voluntary duties could be spread widely. The trustees also bore the expenses of the Bank until it was able to support itself.

By 1830 the bank had proved so popular that it was necessary for the Bank to relocate to larger premises and Cross Street became the Manchester Bank’s new headquarters in 1830. Two years later there was a run on the Bank following rumours about the general security of savings banks. Some 3,000 of its accounts were closed and the Bank had to let out part of its premises to the Law Society. It took some ten years for the Bank to recover and begin expanding again and larger premises were acquired in King Street. By 1856, the Manchester and Salford was the third largest savings bank with nearly one million pounds deposits (the two leaders were St, Martin’s Place with £1.4 million and the Exeter Savings Bank with just over one million pounds).

The Bank’s growth continued through the second half of the nineteenth century helped both by its attention both to smaller deposits, having started a penny bank association in Manchester in 1878, and to larger deposits through the formation of a special investment department. However, the Savings Bank Act of 1891 caused unexpected problems for all those banks that had promoted special investment departments, as they discovered that they had unwittingly made illegal investments. Attempts to amend the legislation failed: savings banks like Manchester and Glasgow practically suspended these investments and others completely closed them. In 1896, Glasgow responded by transferring its special investment business to an investment trust registered under the Companies Act and Manchester was one of the large savings banks that followed suit. More problems came in 1897 when concern over the falling value of government stock led to a run on the Bank. Deposits of £30,000 were withdrawn and the Manchester Bank received support from the Bank of England and the Debt Commissioners.   Deposits began to grow again and by 1910, Manchester still ranked as the third largest savings bank, although this time behind Glasgow and Liverpool.

In 1935, the Trustee Savings Bank showed Manchester with 134,000 active accounts and £14 million of funds. It continued as the third largest society but now it ranked behind Glasgow and Edinburgh, a position it was still holding at the end of WW2. Manchester could, therefore,legitimately be regarded then as the largest savings bank in England. In 1973, the Page Committee report recommended that the trustee savings banks should be reorganised into regional banks. Following the Trustee Savings Bank Act of 1975, the Manchester and Salford Savings Bank merged with seven other savings banks to form the TSB North West Central.

References

1818 establishments
Companies based in Manchester
Defunct banks of the United Kingdom